Foreign relations exist between Austria and Greece.  Both countries have diplomatic relations since the early 19th century, after the Greek War of Independence, and today's relations are considered excellent. 

Since the 17th century, Greek merchants, mostly of the regions of Macedonia and Epirus, were settled in Austria-Hungary and Vienna and made fortunes there. A large part of scholars and intellectuals of the Modern Greek Enlightenment had their base in Vienna.

Today Greece has an embassy in Vienna and an honorary consulate in Salzburg. Austria has an embassy in Athens and six honorary consulates (in Heraklion, Ermoupolis, Corfu, Patras, Rhodes and Thessaloniki). Both countries are full members of the European Union. There is also a Greek community living in Austria.

During the Greek debt crisis, Austria was one of the strongest supporters of Greek positions, such as on the refugee crisis.

Resident diplomatic mission
 Austria has an embassy in Athens.
 Greece has an embassy in Vienna.

See also  
 Foreign relations of Austria
 Foreign relations of Greece
 Greeks in Austria

References

External links 
  List of bilateral treaties between both countries: Austria Ministry of Foreign Affairs (in German only)
 Austrian embassy in Athens (in German and Greek only)
  Greek Foreign Affairs Ministry about relations with Austria
 Greek embassy in Vienna (in Greek and German only)

 
Greece
Austria